Club Deportivo Iruña Voley is a professional women's volleyball team based in Pamplona, Navarre, Spain. It played in Superliga Femenina. It serves as the volley section of CD Iruña.

History
Iruña Voley promoted to Superliga in 2012 and resigned to the league in 2016.

Season to season

2013–14 season squad

References

External links
Official website

Sports teams in Navarre
Spanish volleyball clubs
Volleyball clubs established in 2007
2007 establishments in Spain
Sport in Pamplona